In computing, chaining is a technique used in computer architecture in which scalar and vector registers generate interim results which can be used immediately, without additional memory references which reduce computational     speed. 

The chaining technique was first used by Seymour Cray in the 80 MHz Cray 1 supercomputer in 1976.

References

 
Parallel computing